AXN was an Italian pay television channel owned by Sony Pictures Entertainment. It focused on action-themed programmes, including action series and movies and action reality shows.

The channel was launched in October 2005. In March 2009, it launched its own HD simulcast feed. It closed down, along with AXN Sci-Fi on 28 February 2017.

Programming
Afterworld
Andromeda
Blood Ties
Breaking Bad
The Closer
The Collector
Damages
Fear Factor
.hack//Sign
Hercules: The Legendary Journeys
Kidnapped
Kung Fu
MacGyver
Man's Work
Michael Hayes
Mission: Impossible
Most Shocking
Murder
Mutant X
The Net
New York Undercover
Noein
Odyssey 5
The Outer Limits
Quantum Leap
Painkiller Jane
Planetes
Plunkett & Macleane
Rescue Me
Ripley's Believe It or Not!
Seven Days
The Shield
Sleeper Cell
Sliders
Stargate Universe
Starsky & Hutch
Strong Medicine
Third Watch
Ultimate Force
The Vision of Escaflowne
Wire in the Blood
World's Most Amazing Videos

References

External links
 

AXN
Sony Pictures Television
Defunct television channels in Italy
Television channels and stations established in 2005
Television channels and stations disestablished in 2017
Italian-language television stations
2005 establishments in Italy
2017 disestablishments in Italy